Brandy Camp is an unincorporated community and coal town in Elk County, Pennsylvania, United States. 
Their post office closed in 2005.

References

Unincorporated communities in Elk County, Pennsylvania
Coal towns in Pennsylvania
Unincorporated communities in Pennsylvania